Pseudoalteromonas tunicata is a marine bacterium isolated from the tunicate Ciona intestinalis.

References

External links
Type strain of Pseudoalteromonas tunicata at BacDive -  the Bacterial Diversity Metadatabase

Alteromonadales